French chess player Gilles Andruet, the son of former rally driver Jean-Claude Andruet, was murdered on 22 August 1995. He was drugged before being beaten to death.

Background 
In 1993, Gilles Andruet was using a martingale betting system that he had designed to win at blackjack. The system used Andruet's memory, his mathematical prowess, and the card-counting method devised by American player Ken Uston to its advantage.

In his first year of using the martingale, Andruet won a lot of money and played increasingly often in casinos around the world, both out of enjoyment for the game and for the financial opportunities on offer. He drew attention to himself through his provocative personality and ended up on casinos’ radars. He was ultimately banned from casino blackjack, being referred to as the “Demon of the Game”. Unable to play blackjack, he switched to roulette. However, his exceptional memory and mathematical abilities did not give him an advantage in roulette, and he lost much more than he won. His friends tried in vain to dissuade him from playing. In order to sustain his lifestyle, he started consuming and selling drugs, including heroin and cannabis. This led to the large amount of money won at blackjack rapidly evaporating, and he entered into the vicious cycle of gambling addiction. He spent more money than he had, took out loans that he could not repay, was banned from holding a bank account (known as interdit bancaire – literally “bank-barred” – in France), became homeless, and his lifestyle became increasingly chaotic and vulnerable.

On 4 August 1995, Andruet received a notary’s cheque of 398,000 francs as an advance on an aunt's inheritance. As he was banned from holding a bank account, he was unable to cash the cheque, so he asked his casino acquaintances for help. Joseph Liany – a former businessman whom Andruet had met at the casino in Enghien-les-Bains, on the outskirts of Paris, and who was also a frequent gambler – offered Andruet help through his son Franck. With Frank Liany as a guarantor and proxy, Andruet was able to open a bank account at Moroccan bank Chaabi (a subsidiary of the Banque Populaire du Maroc), where he cashed his cheque.

Murder 
At around 11 p.m. on 21 August 1995, Gilles Andruet drove his car to a branch of the L’Entrecôte restaurant chain in Paris to meet Yolanda, a friend who worked as a waitress there. Three men were in the car with him.

Gilles Andruet's body was discovered by a market trader in the early hours of 22 August 1995, wrapped in a white mattress protector and half submerged in the river Yvette in Saulx-les-Chartreux, in the Essonne département south of Paris. Andruet had been drugged with morphine and Rohypnol – known as a date-rape drug – before repeatedly being hit with a baseball bat. His car was abandoned a few miles away from where his body was found. There were multiple bloodstains in the car boot, while a photocopy of the inheritance cheque was found in the glove compartment. In 2001, mitochondrial DNA was found on a hair on the mattress protector in which Andruet's body had been wrapped. The DNA was a match to an undetermined person in the Liany family. On 25 August 1995, Franck Liany emptied Andruet's bank account.

Suspects 
Franck Liany was a waiter at Golf de l’Étoile, a sports club and bar-restaurant near the Arc de Triomphe in central Paris. Sacha Rhoul, the manager of the club, was his cousin: Liany's father and Rhoul's mother are siblings.

One night in December 1995, Loïc Simon, a waiter at the sports club, openly complained of having received only 30,000 francs of the promised 50,000 from Joseph Liany for beating to death with a baseball bat a chess player who owed gambling debts to Liany. On 14 August 1996, shortly after confessing to murdering Gilles Andruet, Simon committed suicide by hanging. Yolanda, the waitress whom Andruet was meeting on the night of his death, gave a witness testimony confirming that Joseph Liany was one of the passengers in Andruet's car. Following her statement, Yolanda suffered persistent anonymous phone calls in which death threats were made to her and her child. These calls continued even after she changed her telephone number and made it unlisted.

Legal proceedings

First trial (2003) 
The first trial was held in November 2003. Sacha Rhoul was not called and did not attend. Rhoul's cousin, Franck Liany, was charged with receiving a murder weapon, while Rhoul's uncle, Joseph Liany, was charged with the murder of Gilles Andruet. Both defendants pleaded not guilty and blamed each other. 18 witnesses were called, many of whom are believed to have been threatened – they displayed unusual memory lapses or submitted medical certificates excusing them from attending court. Regardless, Franck Liany was found guilty of receiving a murder weapon and sentenced to 7 years’ imprisonment. Joseph Liany was found guilty of murder and sentenced to 15 years’ imprisonment. The latter's conviction rested on witness statements and mitochondrial DNA extracted from the hair found on the mattress protector. Only Joseph Liany appealed his conviction.

Retrial of Joseph Liany (2006) 
Joseph Liany appealed against his conviction and was granted a retrial in March 2006 at the Court of Assizes of the Val-de-Marne département. Sacha Rhoul was tried in absentia, found guilty and sentenced to 15 years’ imprisonment. Despite this, it appeared that Rhoul was living freely in France at the time.

Joseph Liany's defence relied solely on the fact that the mitochondrial DNA could also belong to Sacha Rhoul, Joseph's nephew. This was enough reasonable doubt to see Joseph Liany acquitted, to the despair of Jean-Claude Andruet, Gilles’ father.

References 

1995 in France
People murdered in France
Deaths by person in Paris
People murdered in Paris
1995 murders in France
1994 in Paris
1995 in Paris
1990s murders in Paris